Aphomia zelleri is a species of snout moth in the genus Aphomia. It was described by Joseph de Joannis in 1932, and is known from Central Asia and most of Europe.

The wingspan is 19–27 mm. Adults are on wing from June to August.

The larvae feed on Brachythecium albicans and Ammophila species. They live in a vertical silken tube extending about 100 mm into the sand. The species overwinters in the larval stage. Pupation takes place in the silken tube, just below the surface.

References

External links
Lepiforum.de

Moths described in 1932
Tirathabini
Moths of Asia
Moths of Europe